Smitty may refer to:

People 
 Smitty (rapper), American rapper
 Smitty the Jumper (1898–1995), American parachutist and skydiver H. Truesdell Smith
 Big Bad Smitty (1940–2002), American blues guitar player and singer born John H. Smith
 Smitty Duke (1942–2010), American volleyball player who competed in the 1968 Summer Olympics
 Smitty Gatlin, former singer with the American country and gospel group The Oak Ridge Boys
 Jean-Guy Gendron (born 1934), Canadian retired National Hockey League and World Hockey Association (WHA) player and WHA head coach
 William "Smitty" Pignatelli (born 1959), American politician
 Charles Schmid (1942–1975), American serial killer
 Brian Smith (ice hockey, born 1940) (1940–1995), Canadian National Hockey League player and sportscaster
 Edward "Smitty" Smith (born 1980), American lawyer and government administrator
 James Smith (sports media figure) (born 1959), American host of the television boxing show In This Corner
 James "Smitty" Smith, former member of the American rock band Three Dog Night
 Marvin Smith (born 1961), American jazz drummer
 Merriman Smith (1913–1970), American journalist
 Michael W. Smith (born 1957), contemporary Christian musician
 Mike "Smitty" Smith (1942–2001), drummer with the American rock band Paul Revere & the Raiders
 Mike Smith (broadcaster) (1955–2014), English television and radio presenter
 Scott "Smitty" Smith, member of the American children's band Imagination Movers
 William "Smitty" Smith (1944–1997), Canadian keyboardist and session musician

Fictional characters 
 Jacob "Smitty" Smith, on the television series Ray Donovan
 Morton "Smitty" Smith, a character on the American sitcom The Donna Reed Show 
 "Smitty" Smith, a character on the television series Mad Men
Smitty Ryker, a character on the American movie Hacksaw Ridge
 Smitty, in four episodes of the American sitcom The Cosby Show, played by Adam Sandler
 "Lady Smitty" (Lady Winchester Huntington-Smythe Jones), a character in Veronica's Passport
 Officer Smitty, a character on the American sitcom Sanford and Son
 Officer Smitty, a character on the animated television series Futurama
 Slick Smitty, a character in the show Slylock Fox & Comics for Kids
 Smitty, bartender whose life misfortunes entertain Karen Walker in the sitcom "Will & Grace"

Other uses 
 Smitty (comic strip), a nationally syndicated comic strip from 1922 to 1973
 Smitty (film), a 2012 family film
 smitty, AIX UNIX System Management Interface Tool
 Camp Smitty, a temporary military base; see List of United States Military installations in Iraq
 Smitty's, a restaurant chain in Canada

Lists of people by nickname